

Summary
The season is best remembered as the end of Johan Cruyff's era as Head coach after almost eight years. During the summer, the club make the transfers in of Gheorghe Popescu from Tottenham Hotspur, striker Ángel Cuéllar from Real Betis, forward Meho Kodro from Real Sociedad, Robert Prosinečki from Real Oviedo and the controversial move of Luís Figo from Sporting Lisboa (a petition of Jorge Valdano to the Real Madrid) after a two years ban of Italian Federation due to a double accord of the Portuguese midfielder with both Parma and Juventus.

Cruyff took Hristo Stoichkov and Ronald Koeman out of the team with controversy for fans and President included. In this campaign, the plan of head coach was mix arrivals and a new generation known as "La Quinta de Lo Pelat" (The Five of Lo Pelat) young players such as Iván de la Peña nicked as Pelat, Oscar García, Roger García, Toni Velamazan and Albert Celades.

The team reached its climax on 7 October 1995 defeating Real Betis 5–1 in Sevilla with a memorable exhibition of La Quinta de Lo Pelat, the club were struggling in League against leader of table Atlético Madrid meanwhile competing in 1995–96 Copa del Rey where the squad reached the 1996 Copa del Rey Final and 1996–97 UEFA Cup Semifinals phase.

However, the squad lost in ten days the three trophies, first on 10 April 1996 FC Barcelona was defeated 0-1 by Atlético Madrid in the Copa del Rey Final. Six days later, in Barcelona the squad lost the semifinal 1–2 against Bayern München and was eliminated from the UEFA Cup tournament. The bizarre series of results ended on 20 April 1996 when Atlético Madrid won 3–1 at Camp Nou means that FC Barcelona could not win La Liga for second consecutive year.

The shocking 10 days of losses shattered Johan Cruyff as manager and President Jose Luis Nuñez started contacts with English trainer Bobby Robson during May to replace Cruyff for 1996–97 season. Finally, Nuñez fired Cruyff on 19 May 1996 and signed Robson as the new head coach.

Squad

Transfers

Competitions

La Liga

League table

Results by round

Note: UEFA Cup Winners' Cup spot (in green) being non-related with a position in La Liga, does not appear until the winner is assured to not win La Liga, thus if wins La Liga has a spot in the UEFA Champions League, then 1995–96 Copa del Rey runners-up earns a spot in the 1996–97 UEFA Cup Winners' Cup. Atlético Madrid won their 9th La Liga title in the last matchday, so after matchday 39 Barcelona's places are coloured in green. In light green the spot expected for 1996–97 UEFA Cup Winners' Cup.

Matches

Copa del Rey

Round of 16

Quarterfinals

Semifinals

Final

UEFA Cup

First round

Second round

Eightfinals

Quarterfinals

Semifinals

Friendlies

Statistics

Players statistics

See also
FC Barcelona
1995–96 UEFA Cup
1995–96 La Liga
1995–96 Copa del Rey
Spanish Super Cup

References

FC Barcelona seasons
Barcelona